Franz Vorrath (9 July 1937 – 17 October 2022) was a German Roman Catholic prelate.

Vorrath was born in Germany and was ordained to the priesthood in 1962. He served as titular bishop of Vicus Aterii and as auxiliary bishop of the Roman Catholic Diocese of Essen, Germany, from 1996 until his retirement in 2014.

References

1937 births
2022 deaths
German Roman Catholic bishops
German Roman Catholic titular bishops
20th-century Roman Catholic bishops in Germany
21st-century Roman Catholic bishops in Germany
Bishops appointed by Pope John Paul II
People from Essen